Sopot is a village in northern Bulgaria, located in the Ugarchin Municipality of the Lovech Province.

References

Villages in Lovech Province